Ampflwang im Hausruckwald is a municipality in the district of Vöcklabruck in the Austrian state of Upper Austria.

History 
The village was first mentioned in documents in 1169 and was a farming settlement community until the discovery of lignite around 1766. In 1809, Ampflwang, like the rest of the Hausruckviertel, fell to Bavaria during the Napoleonic Wars, where it remained until 1814.

As lignite, and with it the Wolfsegg-Traunthaler-Kohlenwerks AG (WTK), which operated coal mining in the community, became more and more important, the number of inhabitants rose to over 2,000 after World War I. The consequence was the change from a peasant to an industrial employment structure. Ampflwang was elevated to the status of a market town in 1969 due to its economic importance in the Hausruckviertel. At the same time, the right to bear the municipal coat of arms was granted. 

In the 1970s, the community reached a population of over 4000 people. As early as 1961, the municipal council decided to declare Ampflwang a tourist community. Since that time, the industrial town has transformed itself into a tourist community and is today known above all for its commitment to equestrian tourism.

Due to the fact that most of the coal had been mined out, the expiration of purchase contracts, and also the fact that the production costs of Ampflwang coal were higher than the world market prices, the mining operation was liquidated in 1995. Another small open pit mining operation has been closed in the meantime.

Geography
Ampflwang im Hausruckwald is situated on the southern slope of the Hausruckwald, in the valley of the Ampflwangbach, which is formed by low hill ranges and runs from south to north. Its extension is 5.9 kilometers from north to south and 6 kilometers from west to east. The municipality has an area of 20.57 square kilometers. Of this, 28 percent is agricultural land and 58 percent is forested.

Municipal divisions and population 
During the time when brown coal mining was still prevalent in the Hausruckviertel, many people moved to Ampflwang because they could find well-paid work in the mining industry, although not easy. In the 1961 census, Ampflwang reached its previous peak with 3,965 inhabitants. After WTK decided to close the Ampflwang plant for economic reasons on May 25, 1995, the municipality now has about 14.6 percent fewer inhabitants due to the resulting migration.

The municipal territory includes the following 18 localities (in parentheses number of inhabitants as of January 1, 2022):

Aigen (182)
Ampflwang  (1228)
Buchleiten (248)
Eitzing (8)
Hinterschlagen (96)
Innerleiten (38)
Lukasberg (132)
Ort (120)
Rabelsberg (120)
Rödleiten (105)
Schachen (163)
Scheiblwies (83)
Schmitzberg (83)
Siedlung (560)
Vorderschlagen (51)
Waldpoint (91)
Wassenbach (77)
Wörmansedt (4)

The municipality is congruent with the cadastral municipality of Ampfelwang.

Neighbour Municipalities

Politics 
The municipal council has 25 members.

 With the municipal and mayoral elections in Upper Austria 2009, the municipal council had the following distribution: 13 SPÖ, 7 ÖVP, 4 FPÖ and 1 BZÖ.
 With the municipal council and mayoral elections in Upper Austria 2015, the municipal council had the following distribution: 13 SPÖ, 7 ÖVP and 5 FPÖ.
 With the municipal council and mayoral elections in Upper Austria 2021, the municipal council has the following distribution: 14 SPÖ, 7 ÖVP and 4 FPÖ.

Lsit of Mayors since 1850 

1850–1858 Joseph Mayringer
1858–1861 Franz Innesberger
1861–1864 August Mayr
1864–1867 Josef Plötzeneder
1867–1870 Josef Nähmer
1870–1873 Anton Stokinger
1873–1876 Josef Kinast
1876–1879 Anton Brand
1879–1882 Josef Haas
1882–1885 Josef Plötzeneder
1885–1894 August Mayr
1894–1897 Josef Hochreiner
1897–1901 Josef Haas
1901–1903 Josef Plötzeneder
1903–1907 Leopold Mühringer
1907–1909 Franz Nöhammer
1909–1910 Karl Kienast
1910–1912 Anton Kienast
1912–1916 Josef Hötzinger
1916–1919 Josef Plötzeneder
1919–1924 Anton Brand
1924–1925 Josef Wambacher
1925–1927 Josef Huemer
1927–1929 Franz Eberl
1929–1934 Franz Huemer
1934–1934 Ludwig Irresberger
1934–1934 Franz Harringer
1934–1938 Albert Plötzeneder
1938–1942 Josef Braumann
1942–1943 Johann Pachinger
1943–1943 Franz Enser
1943–1945 Franz Redlinger
1945–1945 Paul Neulentner
1945–1945 Johann Doppler
1945–1945 Paul Neulentner
1945–1968 Johann Doppler
1968–1997 Roland Kaltenbrunner
1997–2015 Rosemarie Schönpass
2015–2021 Monika Pachinger (SPÖ)
seit 2021 Christian Kienast (SPÖ)

Coat of Arms

References 

Cities and towns in Vöcklabruck District